Branko Vidović (4 September 1923 – 5 October 2013) was a Croatian swimmer who won a bronze medal in the 4×200 m freestyle relay at the 1950 European Aquatics Championships. He finished fifth in the same event at the 1948 Summer Olympics.

References

1923 births
2013 deaths
Croatian male freestyle swimmers
Swimmers at the 1948 Summer Olympics
Olympic swimmers of Yugoslavia
Croatian male swimmers
European Aquatics Championships medalists in swimming